Acanthoceras is an extinct cephalopod genus belonging to the subclass Ammonoidea and family Acanthoceratidae that lived from the Albian to early Coniacian stages of the Cretaceous.

Description
Their shells had ornate ribs whose function is unknown, although some scientists have speculated that these ribs helped strengthen the animals' shells to allow them to live at greater depths where the water pressure is higher.

Species
 A. athabascense Warren and Stelck, 1955
 A. chasca Benavides-Caceres, 1956
 A. compitalis Stoyanow, 1949
 A. folleatum White, 1887
 A. joserita Stoyanow, 1949
 A. jukesbrownei Spath, 1926
 A. offarcinatum White, 1887
 A. pollocense Benavides-Caceres, 1956
 A. rhotomagensis (Brongniart, 1822)
 A. sangalense Benavides-Caceres, 1956
 A. seitzi Riedel, 1932
 A. wintoni Adkins, 1928

Distribution 
Acanthoceras fossils have been found in Australia, Brazil, Bulgaria, Colombia (Hondita Formation, Prado, Tolima), Denmark, Egypt, Marocco, France, Germany, India (Gujarat)
, Iran, Madagascar, Mexico, Mozambique, Nigeria, Papua New Guinea, Peru, the United Kingdom, United States (California, Minnesota, New Mexico, Texas), and Venezuela.

References

Bibliography

Further reading
 W.J. Arkell et al., 1957 Mesozoic Ammonoidea, Treatise on Invertebrate Paleontology Part L. Geological Society of America, University of Kansas Press

External links 
 Acanthoceras in the Paleobiology Database

Acanthoceratidae
Ammonitida genera
Albian genus first appearances
Coniacian genus extinctions
Ammonites of Africa
Cretaceous Africa
Ammonites of Asia
Cretaceous Asia
Late Cretaceous ammonites of Europe
Cretaceous France
Late Cretaceous ammonites of North America
Cretaceous Mexico
Cretaceous United States
Ammonites of South America
Cretaceous Brazil
Cretaceous Colombia
Cretaceous Peru
Cretaceous Venezuela
Ammonites of Australia
Cretaceous animals of Australia
Fossil taxa described in 1875